Huddersfield Town's 1912–13 campaign was a season which saw Town establish themselves as a possible force to be reckoned with in Division 2. They would finish in 5th place under new manager Arthur Fairclough.

Squad at the start of the season

Review
After managing to survive the threat of liquidation the previous season, the team managed to emerge as a force in Division 2 under Arthur Fairclough. The attacking forces of James Macauley and Frank Mann helped Town reach 5th place, just 7 points behind 2nd placed Burnley.

Squad at the end of the season

Results

Division Two

FA Cup

Appearances and goals

Huddersfield Town A.F.C. seasons
Huddersfield Town F.C.